Verdunville is an unincorporated community and census-designated place (CDP) in Logan County, West Virginia, United States. Verdunville has a post office with ZIP code 25649. The Verdunville CDP includes the neighboring community of Shegon. As of the 2010 census, the total CDP population was 687.

The community's name commemorates the Battle of Verdun.

Geography
Verdunville is in west-central Logan County, in the valley of the Mud Fork, an east-flowing tributary of Island Creek and part of the Guyandotte River watershed. Mud Fork Road runs up the valley from Mount Gay in the east (near Logan), through Verdunville and Shegon to the northwest, and leads eventually to Dingess in Mingo County. U.S. Route 119, a four-lane expressway, forms the eastern edge of the Verdunville CDP, with the closest access from an interchange with West Virginia Route 73 north of the Mud Fork valley.

References

Census-designated places in Logan County, West Virginia
Census-designated places in West Virginia